Agdistis turkestanica is a moth of the family Pterophoridae. It is found in Turkmenistan and Turkestan.

References

External links
Новые виды молевидных чешуекрылых (Lepidoptera: Tineidae, Incurvariidae, Brachodidae, Pterophoridae) фауны СССР

Moths described in 1990
Agdistinae